The Three Steps are three prominent rocky steps on the northeast ridge of Mount Everest. The Second Step is especially significant both historically and in mountaineering terms. Any climber who wants to climb on the normal route from the north of the summit must negotiate these three stages.

The First Step consists of large boulders that pose a serious obstacle, even for experienced climbers, because of their location high in the Death Zone. Many mountaineers have died near the First Step, among them "Green Boots", a corpse wearing neon green climbing boots and a red coat, which serves as a somber landmark for climbers to gauge their distance to the top, and which has now been possibly identified as Tsewang Paljor. His fellow climbers, who also perished on the same day as he in 1996, are Tsewang Smanla and Dorje Morup. Other climbers have died under that rock as well, namely David Sharp and Francys Arsentiev.

The Second Step is the best known of the rocky steps. The steep section, at an altitude of 8,610 m, has a climbing height of 40 metres, of which the last five are almost vertical. The step was apparently climbed for the first time in 1960 when Wang Fuzhou, Gongbu and Qu Yinhua claimed to have completed the first ascent via the north ridge, with their teammate Liu Lianman volunteering to be a human ladder up the step. Despite being widely accepted, there is inconclusive evidence to support the claim. The climbing difficulty of this spot was reduced in 1975 when a Chinese team affixed an aluminium ladder to the step that has been used since then by almost all climbers. In 2007, out of safety considerations, the original  ladder was replaced with a new one by Chinese and international mountaineers. The original ladder is now on display at the Mount Qomolangma Museum in Tibet.

The Third Step is easiest to climb. Its climbing height is about 10 metres, after which the summit snowfield is reached.

Important climbs of the Second Step
The 1921 British Mount Everest reconnaissance expedition was the first to attempt to climb Mount Everest. It was followed by further British expeditions in 1922, 1924, and 1933. The climbers had to make the ascent from the north, since Nepal was closed. The situation became reversed after the communist victory in the Battle of Chamdo; expeditions launched after that had to use the southern approach through Nepal. The technical difficulties, especially in climbing the Second Step, were still unknown. There is ongoing discussion as to whether the Second Step was ever surmounted by George Mallory and Andrew Irvine in 1924. It was surmounted in 1960 as part of the first ascent of Mount Everest via the north route, when a shoulder stand was used to climb the last five metres.

The step was first climbed unaided in 1985, by the Spaniard Òscar Cadiach. He assessed the final rock face as 5.7 to 5.8 (V+ in UIAA classification).
Theo Fritsche, an Austrian, climbed the step in 2001 free solo on-sight and came to a similar conclusion. Conrad Anker climbed the Second Step in 1999 and assessed the level of difficulty as 5.10. On this ascent Anker supported himself using the Chinese ladder. In 2007, Anker repeated the climb with Leo Houlding; this time, however, he first removed the ladder in order to climb the step unaided.

Sources 
 Mantovani, Roberto and Diemberger, Kurt (1997). Mount Everest – Kampf in eisigen Höhen. Moewig. 
 Hemmleb, Jochen (2009). Tatort Mount Everest: Der Fall Mallory – Neue Fakten und Hintergründe. Herbig, Munich. .

See also 
Hillary Step

References

External links 
 Photograph of the Second Step including ladder and fixed ropes
 Photograph of second step with mountaineers
 Painting of the complete second step including ladder and ropes
 BBC - Future - The tragic tale of Mt Everest's most famous dead body - Story by Rachel Nuwer

Himalayas
Mount Everest